Dalvin Ertimus DeGrate (born July 23, 1971, in Hampton, Virginia) is an American R&B and soul musician, singer and rapper, best known for his days as Mr. Dalvin, one-quarter of the R&B group Jodeci.

Career

The rapper for the group, DeGrate rarely sang lead on Jodeci tracks, although he has production and songwriting credits on Diary of A Mad Band and The Show, The After Party, The Hotel. He occasionally played drums onstage.

He released his first solo album, Met.A.Mor.Phic, on April 18, 2000, with the single "Why Can't We".

He moved to Def Jam Recordings, and recorded his second album, Met.A.Mor.Phic 2: The Rivalry of a Singer and A Rapper, with appearances by Method Man, Redman, Ludacris. The album was due to be released in 2010, but he decided to leave Def Jam and form his own label, DeGrate Productions, after a dispute.

In 2012 he announced he was working on an album called "Egomaniac", but it has been shelved.

In 2014 DeGrate set up a new record label with music executive Cassandra Mills, called Christo Chrome Music.

In 2017 he released a single called "Vindication (Get Money) feat GOODZ", he also did a video for this single, a new album is yet to come in 2018.

Family 
DeGrate has a brother, Devante Swing, born Donald DeGrate, Jr. They toured as Gospel singers before they joined with JoJo Hailey and K-Ci Hailey (born Cedric Hailey), forming Jodeci. and a younger brother Derick DeGrate

Discography

with Jodeci
 Forever My Lady (1991)
 Diary of a Mad Band (1993)
 The Show, the After Party, the Hotel (1995)
 The Past, The Present, The Future (2015)

Solo albums
 Met.A.Mor.Phic (2000)

References

External links
 

Record producers from North Carolina
American soul singers
Jodeci members
Living people
Singer-songwriters from Virginia
1971 births
Musicians from Hampton, Virginia
African-American male songwriters
21st-century African-American male singers